János Söre (born 14 May 1935) is a Hungarian former cyclist. He competed in the 1000m time trial at the 1960 Summer Olympics.

References

External links
 

1935 births
Living people
Hungarian male cyclists
Olympic cyclists of Hungary
Cyclists at the 1960 Summer Olympics
Cyclists from Budapest